Bradley Potts (born 3 July 1994) is an English footballer who plays as a midfielder for Preston North End.

Career
Potts began his career with Carlisle United and made his professional debut on 11 August 2012 in a 1–0 win against Accrington Stanley in the first round of the League Cup. He made his league debut a week later, playing 90 minutes of a 1–1 draw against Stevenage on 18 August. On 12 June 2015, Potts signed for Blackpool after his contract at Carlisle expired. On 3 August 2017 Potts joined Championship side Barnsley on a three-year deal for an undisclosed fee. On 4 January 2019, Potts moved to Championship side Preston North End for a reported incoming record transfer fee paid by the club in excess of £1.5 million. January 2019.

International career
On 8 November 2012, Potts was called up to the England under-19 squad to play Finland in a friendly on 13 November in Telford. He made his debut in the game which England won 1–0.

Social Media Issue
Some years before he joined Preston North End he and his friends filmed a video of him defecating on a car, with the video re-surfacing online in June 2021. Potts apologised for having done so, and Preston stated they would deal with it internally.

Career statistics

Honours

Club
Blackpool
EFL League Two play-offs: 2017

Barnsley
EFL League One runner-up: 2018–19

References

External links

1994 births
Living people
English footballers
Association football midfielders
England youth international footballers
Carlisle United F.C. players
Blackpool F.C. players
Barnsley F.C. players
Preston North End F.C. players
English Football League players